The 102 mm 60 caliber Pattern 1911 was a Russian naval gun developed in the years before World War I that armed a variety of warships of the Imperial Russian Navy during World War I.  Pattern 1911 guns found a second life on river gunboats and armored trains during the Russian Civil War and as coastal artillery during World War II.  In 1941 it was estimated that 146 guns were in service. Of these, 49 were in the Baltic Fleet, 30 in the Black Sea Fleet, 30 in the Pacific Fleet, 18 in the Northern Fleet, 9 in the Caspian Flotilla and 6 in the Pinsk Flotilla.

History 
The requirement to re-equip destroyers of the Imperial Russian fleet with guns larger than the current 75 mm 50 caliber Pattern 1892 was raised by the chief of the Baltic Fleet Mine Division, Nikolai Ottowitsch von Essen, in January 1907.  The design for the new gun was completed with technical assistance from the British Vickers company at the Obukhov State plant in 1908 and testing was completed in August 1909.

Construction
Pattern 1911 guns were produced at the Obukhov state plant and the Perm artillery factory between 1911 and 1921.  In 1911 an order for 505 guns was placed of which 225 were delivered by January 1, 1917.  Another 200 were expected to be produced during 1917 and 83 in 1918. In 1921 an order for 85 guns was placed at the Perm factory, but this was reduced to 48 guns.  The Pattern 1911 was constructed of an A tube, reinforced by three hoops which were put on while hot and screwed onto the breech.  The Pattern 1911 had a high rate of fire 12-15 rpm (10 rpm practical) due to the use of Fixed QF ammunition and a semi-automatic, horizontal wedge breech mechanism.  After ejecting each empty case the gun re-cocked itself and kept breech open for the next round. It also had the usual combination of hydraulic buffer and spring recuperator.  The original naval mounts were short and had low angles of elevation between -6° to +20°.  Latter mounts were taller and had high angles of elevation between -10° to +30°.

Naval Use
Pattern 1911 guns armed a variety of ships such as destroyers, guard ships, gunboats, landing craft, minelayers and torpedo cruisers of the Imperial Russian Navy. After the 1917 October Revolution the successor states of Estonia, Finland, and the Soviet Union all used this gun. Pattern 1911 guns were also used on World War I era destroyers bought by Bulgaria and Peru. Some Romanian cruise ships were lent to Russia in WWI, to be used as auxiliary cruisers, and equipped with 102 mm Obukhov guns. During Bolshevik Revolution most of those ships returned to Romania. In WWII, about 3 to 5 guns were used by Romanians as coastal artillery in Sulina & Sf.Gheorghe Black Sea sectors.

Ship classes which carried the Pattern 1911:

 Derzky-class destroyers
 Fidonisy-class destroyers
 Finn-class torpedo cruisers
 Gavril-class destroyers
 General Kondratenko-class torpedo cruisers
 Golub-class guard ships
 Kars-class gunboats
 Kazarskiy-class torpedo cruisers
 Izyaslav-class destroyers
 Orfey-class destroyers
 Shchastlivyi-class destroyers
 Ukrayna-class torpedo cruisers
 Uragan-class guard ships
 Vsadnik-class torpedo cruisers
 Zhemchug-class guard ships

Ammunition 
Ammunition was 101.6 x 790mm R and of Fixed QF type. The projectiles weighed between 

The gun was able to fire:
 Armor Piercing
 Common shell
 High Explosive
 Illumination
 Incendiary
 Shrapnel

Photo Gallery

References

Notes

Artillery of the Russian Empire
Artillery of the Soviet Union
Coastal artillery
100 mm artillery
Obukhov State Plant products